Allotalanta ochthotoma is a moth in the family Cosmopterigidae. It was described by Edward Meyrick in 1930. It is found in Cameroon.

References

Endemic fauna of Cameroon
Moths described in 1930
Cosmopteriginae
Moths of Africa